Wang Yu may refer to:

 Wang Yu (chancellor) (died 768), chancellor of Tang Dynasty
 Jimmy Wang Yu (1943-2022), Taiwanese-Hong Kong martial arts actor
 Wong Yue (1955-2008), Hong Kong martial arts film actor
 Wang Yu (filmmaker), Chinese director and cinematographer, active since the 1990s
 Wang Yu (general) (born 1964), People's Liberation Army Navy admiral
 Wang Yu (lawyer) (born 1971), Chinese human rights lawyer
 Wang Yu (tennis) (born 1981), Chinese tennis player
 Wang Yu (chess player) (born 1982), chess player from China
 Wang Yu (high jumper) (born 1991), Chinese high jumper
 Wang Yu (footballer) (born 2002), Chinese football player

See also 
 Wang You (Wang Yu in Wade-Giles, 1910-1997), Chinese biochemist